Cándido Gálvez (1901 – death date unknown) was a Cuban pitcher in the Negro leagues between 1929 and 1932.

A native of Havana, Cuba, Gálvez pitched for the Cuban Stars (West), and for the Pollock's Cuban Stars in 1932.

References

External links
 and Seamheads

1901 births
Date of birth missing
Year of death missing
Place of death missing
Cuban Stars (West) players
Pollock's Cuban Stars players
Baseball pitchers
Baseball players from Havana
Cuban expatriate baseball players in the United States